Chen Yanyan is the name of:

Chen Yen-yen (1916–1999), Chinese actress, also known as Chen Yanyan
Chen Yanyan (swimmer) (born 1985), Chinese swimmer